West Tamar Council is a local government body in Tasmania, situated along the western side of the Tamar River in the north of the state. West Tamar is classified as an urban local government area and has a population of 23,769, it extends from the outer reaches of north-west Launceston and includes the towns and localities of Beaconsfield, Beauty Point and Legana.

History and attributes
The municipality was established on 2 April 1993, after the boundaries of the Beaconsfield municipality were extended and its name changed to West Tamar. West Tamar is classified as urban, fringe and small under the Australian Classification of Local Governments.

The municipal area starts with the Launceston suburb of Riverside in the south; the satellite suburb of Legana; the towns of Exeter, Beaconsfield and Beauty Point, all the way up to the beach resort town of Greens Beach at the mouth of the Tamar River.

Suburbs

Not in above list
 Birralee
 Parkham
 Rosevale
 Selbourne

See also
List of local government areas of Tasmania

References

External links

West Tamar Council official website
Local Government Association Tasmania
Tasmanian Electoral Commission - local government

 
Local government areas of Tasmania